Metropolitan Fresno, officially Fresno–Madera, CA CSA, is a metropolitan area in the San Joaquin Valley, in the United States, consisting of Fresno and Madera counties. It is the third-largest metropolitan region in Northern California, behind the San Francisco Bay Area and Greater Sacramento. It is also the 49th-largest CSA in the U.S. as of 2010 census.

Metropolitan Fresno is anchored by Fresno, the fifth-largest city in California and the 35th-largest in the United States. The metropolitan area is located in the Central Valley, which is one of the world's most productive agricultural regions. It has a large agricultural economy despite being increasingly urbanized. In more recent years, statewide droughts in California have further strained both the Fresno metropolitan area's and the entire Central Valley's water security.

Counties

Overview

Metropolitan Fresno, unlike the other metropolitan regions of California, is still largely agricultural, contains a large rural land area and is centered in the San Joaquin Valley. The metropolitan area is located between the larger metropolitan areas of California, bordering the southernmost boundaries of the San Francisco Bay Area in the west and separated from the Greater Sacramento and Greater Los Angeles Areas to the north and south respectively by long distances of rural areas and farmland. Additionally, the lifestyle and culture of Metropolitan Fresno does not reflect the San Francisco or Sacramento influence as other areas have in Northern California due to distance from the state capital and bordering an unpopulated area of the outskirts of the Bay Area. Instead, Metropolitan Fresno is more influenced by the interior valley region of California although as the area becomes more urbanized, it has become slightly more influenced by the other metropolitan areas of Northern California, particularly the Bay Area.

Fresno is the largest city in the area and in the Central Valley. Along with Sacramento, it is the economic center of California's interior and is one of the fastest-growing cities in the United States, with the region having a growth of over 20% since 2000. Fresno is a major transportation hub for visitors heading to Yosemite, Kings Canyon and Sequoia National Parks, which are 60 mi (97 km) and 75 mi (121 km) away from Fresno respectively with Fresno being the nearest major city from the parks. The United States Military has a heavy presence in the Fresno area and numerous divisions are based in Metropolitan Fresno, including the 40th Aviation Brigade and 144th Fighter Wing. Fresno County is the largest agricultural county and has the largest concentration of agriculture than any other county in the United States.

Madera County is primarily an agricultural county as well but its cities serve as suburbs of Fresno. Since 2010, statewide droughts in California have further strained both the Fresno metropolitan area's and the entire Central Valley's water security.

Geography and climate

Geography
Metropolitan Fresno is primarily located in the San Joaquin Valley, which in turn is a part of the larger Central Valley region of California, one of the world's most important agricultural areas. The eastern portions of the area border the Sierra Nevada mountains and the western portions border the Coast Ranges, thus giving the edges of the area higher elevations than the inner valley areas. Several waterways traverse the region, including the San Joaquin and Kings rivers, the Delta-Mendota and Madera canals, and the California Aqueduct, providing water to crops.  The California Aqueduct is one of the world's longest artificial aqueducts.

Climate
Metropolitan Fresno has a Mediterranean climate (Köppen Csa) with some semi-arid factors due to its interior location (Köppen Bsh), with mild, moderately wet winters and hot and dry summers. December is the coolest month, with an average of  during the day in downtown Fresno while summer temperatures can reach  or more. Thick tule fog is present in the valley areas during the winter. Rainfall is most common between December and April while snowfall is sometimes experienced in the higher mountain elevations.

Cities

Census-designated places

 Auberry
 Biola
 Bonadelle Ranchos-Madera Ranchos
 Bowles
 Calwa
 Cantua Creek
 Caruthers
 Del Rey
 Easton
 Friant
 Lanare

 Laton
 Madera Acres
 Oakhurst
 Parksdale
 Parkwood
 Raisin City
 Riverdale
 Shaver Lake
 Squaw Valley
 Tranquillity
 Yosemite Lakes

Transportation

Owing to its gateway location to numerous national parks as well as being in between the larger Greater Los Angeles and San Francisco Bay Area and Greater Sacramento regions, Metropolitan Fresno serves as a transportation hub in the California interior. However, unlike the larger metropolitan areas of California, Metropolitan Fresno does not have a large public transit system but is served by numerous freeways and highways.

Highways and freeways
Metropolitan Fresno is served by a large number of highways and freeways that are vital in linking the rest of Northern California with Southern California and its location in between the three larger metropolitan areas of the state allows for a large trucking industry as well as services to travelers. Highways and freeways in Metropolitan Fresno include:

  Interstate 5
  State Route 33
  State Route 41
  State Route 43
  State Route 49
  State Route 63
  State Route 99

  State Route 145
  State Route 152
  State Route 168
  State Route 180
  State Route 198
  State Route 201
  State Route 269

Air
The Fresno Yosemite International Airport is the only commercial airport in the region and is a major gateway into Yosemite National Park. Additionally, there are several general aviation airports in the area, including Fresno Chandler Executive Airport, Firebaugh Airport, Sierra Sky Park Airport and Madera Municipal Airport.

Public transit
Metropolitan Fresno's central California location allows it to be a large rail transport center. Two Amtrak rail stations are located in the area, Santa Fe Passenger Depot and Madera which are on the San Joaquin line. Fresno Area Express and Madera County Express serve as bus transit lines connecting to downtown Fresno. Greyhound and Orange Belt Stages provide long distance bus travel to the area.

Politics

Unlike the other metropolitan areas of California, Metropolitan Fresno has historically been a strong Republican stronghold and the region reflects the Coastal California and interior California divide in which coastal areas and urbanized areas of California tend to lean Democratic while interior areas tend to lean Republican. Exceptions to this are Orange County in Greater Los Angeles, which has been a Republican stronghold since the 1940s, and most of Greater Sacramento, which is a politically competitive area where the major parties are often divided in pluralities although recently there have been Democratic majorities. Metropolitan Fresno has begun to become a politically competitive region as well, as in the 2008 presidential election, the region was split with Fresno County going for Barack Obama with the majority of the votes, while John McCain carried Madera County with a comfortable margin. Locally, Democratic concentrations are found in much of Fresno and most non-agricultural suburbs while Republican concentrations are found in Madera County and most rural towns.

References

Metropolitan areas of California
Geography of Fresno County, California
Geography of Madera County, California